Acebo may refer to:

Acebo (river), northern Spain
Acebo, Cáceres, Spain
El Acebo, village in Molinaseca, El Bierzo, Spain
Alexander V. Acebo (1927–2019), American politician